Leaving or Leavin'  may refer to:

Film, theatre and television 
 Leaving (TV series), a 1984-1985 UK series featuring Keith Barron and Susan Hampshire
 Leaving (1997 film), a Japanese film starring Kotomi Kyono
 Leaving (2009 film), a French film by Catherine Corsini
 Leaving (2011 film), a Czech film directed by Václav Havel and based on his play (see next)
 Leaving (play), a 2007 play by Václav Havel
 Leaving (TV series), a 2012 UK series featuring Linzey Cocker

Music 
 Leaving (album), a 1976 album by Richard Beirach and Jeremy Steig
 [[Leavin' (album)|Leavin''' (album)]], a 2006 album by Natalie Cole
 "Leaving" (Pet Shop Boys song), 2012
 Leaving (EP), a 2013 EP by Skrillex whose title track is "Leaving"
 "Leavin' " (Jesse McCartney song), 2008
 "Leavin' " (Tony! Toni! Toné! song), 1994
 "Leaving", a song by The Starting Line from With Hopes of Starting Over... "Leaving", a song by Westlife from Where We Are''

See also
 
 Leave (disambiguation)
 Leaves (disambiguation)
 Left (disambiguation)